This is a list of vice presidents of the Control Yuan:

List

Before the 1947 constitution 
 Period: 1928 – 1948

After the 1947 constitution (indirect elections)
 Period: 1948 – 1993

After the 1947 Constitution (presidential nomination)
 Period: 1993 – present

Timeline

References 

Control Yuan
Control Yuan